Mary Adelaide Broadhurst (23 May 1860 – 8 December 1928) was a United Kingdom agricultural reformer and radical. She was a leading suffragette who founded the National Land Council which trained women during the first world war to work on the land. After the war she championed the rights of Palestine and resisted the rise of Bolsheviks.

Life
Broadhurst was born in Chorlton-on-Medlock in 1860. Her parents were Maria (born Hutchinson) and William Broadhurst and she was their eldest child. Her father was a city councillor in Manchester, a bookkeeper and accountant. She was awarded an MA degree by the University of London and then taught at Liverpool Ladies' College. In 1880 she moved to Glasgow and worked as a science teacher at the Park School for Girls, Glasgow. She aimed to introduce practical laboratory study in the physical sciences and in 1882 also joined the Glasgow Natural History Society.

Broadhurst's public life began as a leader in the women's suffrage movement. She and Margaret Milne Farquharson had been the salaried Liverpool organisers for the Women's Freedom League, but the WFL failed to establish a voice distinct from the WSPU despite some novel campaigning. Money was requested for a full-time organiser but the posts were not supported after January 1909.

In 1911 she formed the National Political League which was an apolitical group supporting reform. She was its president until her death. Suffragette and funder Janie Allan, socialist Ethel Annakin Snowden, suffragette Laura Ainsworth, MP George Lansbury and John Scurr were amongst the league's supporters. She was the president and Margaret Milne Farquharson was the secretary and the NPL was based in St James Street in London.

During the war the NPL created the National Land Council. This body created eleven locations in Britain where women could be trained to work on the land.

The National Political League changed its name in 1917 to the National Political Reform League. By 1922 the NPL had aligned themselves with supporting the Palestinians and Arabs in general. Broadhurst wrote a nationalistic letter to the Times and to parliament. It would appear that the NPL were supporting the Arab cause as they objected to the UK governments support for Zionism and they wanted to resist that and the rise of Bolshevikism.

The NPL was funded by leading Muslims and UK government cabinet members were advised to avoid it. It was trying to undermine or overturn the Balfour Declaration. Broadhurst died in 1928. From 1929 the NPL continued its work and it was in touch with the Muslim–Christian Alliance of Palestine.

References

1860 births
1928 deaths
People from Chorlton-on-Medlock
English suffragettes